Lac de Vallon is a lake at Bellevaux in the Haute-Savoie department of France. The lake formed in 1943 when a landslide blocked the course of the Brévon river.

Vallon, Lac